Digitalis laevigata, common names Grecian foxglove or giraffe foxglove, is a species of flowering plant in the genus Digitalis, in the family Plantaginaceae.

Subspecies
Digitalis laevigata subsp. graeca (Ivanina) Werner 
Digitalis laevigata subsp. laevigata Waldst. & Kit.

Description
This perennial herbaceous plant has erect stems with lance-shaped leaves, while basal leaves are oblong to ovate. It produces spires of orange or yellow-brown bell-shaped flowers with a large whitish lower lip and purple veined, speckled interiors. It blooms from May to July.

Distribution
This species is native to southern Europe. It grows wild in the Balkans.

References

laevigata